Peter Pouly (born 29 June 1977 in Saint-Étienne) is a French former professional cyclist, who competed professionally in road racing and mountain biking for  and the . He now works as a directeur sportif for UCI Continental team .

Doping ban
Pouly served a suspension of one year from 12 December 2002 to 12 December 2003 for doping.

Major results

1995
 1st  Cross-country, National Junior Mountain Bike Championships
 1st Roc Laissagais
 4th Cross-country, UCI Junior Mountain Bike World Championships
1998
 1st  Cross-country, National Under-23 Mountain Bike Championships
1999
 1st  Cross-country, National Under-23 Mountain Bike Championships
2001
 3rd Roc d'Azur
2002
 1st Roc d'Azur
 1st GP Meyruels
2004
 1st  Marathon cross-country, National Mountain Bike Championships
2005
 1st  Marathon cross-country, National Mountain Bike Championships
 2nd Roc d'Azur
2011
 1st Overall Haute Route
2012
 1st Overall Haute Route
 1st Doi Inthanon
 2nd Taiwan KOM Challenge
2013
 1st Overall Haute Route
 1st Doi Inthanon
 3rd L'Étape du Tour
2014
 1st Overall Haute Route
 1st  Overall Tour de Ijen
1st  Mountains classification
1st Stage 3
 1st La Marmotte
 2nd L'Étape du Tour
2015
 1st Overall Tour de Ijen
1st  Mountains classification
1st Stage 3
 1st Overall Haute Route
2016
 9th Overall Sharjah International Cycling Tour
2017
 2nd Overall Tour of Poyang Lake
2018
 1st Doi Inthanon Challenge #11

References

External links

1977 births
Living people
French male cyclists
Doping cases in cycling
Sportspeople from Saint-Étienne
Cyclists from Auvergne-Rhône-Alpes